Gee Creek may refer to:

 Gee Creek (Florida)
 Gee Creek (Washington)